Wildwood Lake can refer to:

 Lake Wildwood, California
 Wildwood Lake (Georgia)
 Wildwood Lake (Jackson County, Missouri)
 Wildwood Lake (Jefferson County, Missouri)
 Wildwood Lake (New York)
 Wildwood Lake, Tennessee